South Wingfield is a village and civil parish in Derbyshire, England, it is now part of the borough of Amber Valley and formerly in the Scarsdale hundred. The population of the civil parish at the 2011 census was 1,514.

History and description

An ex-mining village, it has a mixed community. Its most famous landmark is Wingfield Manor, a ruined manor house built around 1450 and now managed by English Heritage (though  the manor was closed to the public during conservation work). It sits astride one 'B' class road, the B5035, and the River Amber runs through the lower parts of the parish. The centre of the village is at the Market Place, where Manor Road, Church Lane, Inns Lane and the High Road meet.

Other notable places in the village are the parish church of All Saints, dating from the 13th century, the Methodist Chapel, a Baptist Chapel and a Gospel Hall. The village school was built in 1875. The parish of South Wingfield extends to cover the wider area covering the village of Oakerthorpe and the hamlets of Moorwood Moor, Wingfield Park and Uftonfields.

Both North Wingfield and South Wingfield have forms of the same place-name, formed from "winn" (pasture) and "feld" (open land). The earlier forms of each are not distinguished but in 1284 a Middle English form of South Wingfield occurs.

See also 
 Listed buildings in South Wingfield
 List of places in Derbyshire
 Pentrich and South Wingfield Revolution Group

References

Villages in Derbyshire
Towns and villages of the Peak District
Geography of Amber Valley